Homalium dalzielii is a species of plant in the family Salicaceae. It is found in Benin and Nigeria.

References

dalzielii
Vulnerable plants
Taxonomy articles created by Polbot